The 1900 All-Ireland Senior Hurling Championship was the 14th staging of the All-Ireland hurling championship since its establishment by the Gaelic Athletic Association in 1887. The championship began on 12 May 1901 and ended on 26 October 1902.

Tipperary were the defending champions, and retained their title following a 2-5 to 0-6 defeat of London in the final.

Format

All-Ireland Championship

Semi-final: (2 matches) The four provincial representatives make up the semi-final pairings.  Two teams are eliminated at this stage while the two winning teams advance to the home final.

Home final: (1 match) The winners of the two semi-finals contest this game.  One team is eliminated while the winning team advances to the final.

Final: (1 match) The winners of the home final and London, who receive a bye to this stage of the championship, contest this game.  The winners are declared All-Ireland champions.

Results

Connacht Senior Hurling Championship

Leinster Senior Hurling Championship

Semi-final

Final

Munster Senior Hurling Championship

Quarter-finals

Semi-finals

Final

All-Ireland Senior Hurling Championship

Semi-finals

Home final

Final

Championship statistics

Miscellaneous

 A team from Ulster participates in the championship for the first time with Antrim representing the northern province.
 The Connacht championship is contested for the first time.
 One of the All-Ireland semi-finals sees the Leinster and Munster champions play against each other.  This did not happen again until the 1928 championship.
 As a gesture to the exiles, London were allowed to participate in the championship for the first time and are given a bye to the final.
 Tipperary become the second team to win three successive All-Ireland titles.

References

Sources

 Corry, Eoghan, The GAA Book of Lists (Hodder Headline Ireland, 2005).
 Donegan, Des, The Complete Handbook of Gaelic Games (DBA Publications Limited, 2005).

1900